Bowinn Ma, MLA  is a Canadian politician, who was elected to the Legislative Assembly of British Columbia in the 2017 provincial election.  Ma then stood for re-election in the 2020 British Columbia general election, again for the British Columbia New Democratic Party. Ma won decisively a second term, in spite of some BC Liberal harassment of her. She represents the electoral district of North Vancouver-Lonsdale as a member of the British Columbia New Democratic Party caucus.

Ma serves as the Minister of Emergency Management and Climate Readiness, a new position in the Eby ministry. In the Horgan ministry following the 2020 election, Ma was the Minister of State for Infrastructure, and also served on the Treasury Board.  Minister Ma's mandate included specific TransLink SkyTrain expansion projects, the Massey Tunnel replacement and completing the Pattullo Bridge.  

From 2017 to 2020, Ma served as the Parliamentary Secretary for TransLink, as a member of the Cabinet Housing Working Group Committee, as a member of the Select Standing Committee on Public Accounts, and as the Chair of the Select Standing Committee on Crown Corporations.,

Ma is the youngest member of the current British Columbia Legislative Assembly, and the Canadian born daughter of Taiwanese immigrants. Ma, Katrina Chen, and Anne Kang are the first MLAs of Taiwanese heritage to be elected to the Legislative Assembly of British Columbia.

Ma was the first New Democrat to win a seat on the North Shore since David Schreck in 1991. She defeated two-term incumbent BC Liberal Minister Naomi Yamamoto as a first-time candidate. The North Vancouver-Lonsdale upset result is often credited in part to increased turnout from Squamish Nation voters and the political mobilization of the Iranian-Canadian community, both of whom strongly favoured Ma.

Background 
Ma graduated from the University of British Columbia in 2008 with a Bachelor of Applied Science degree in civil engineering, which included a focus in transportation, and then from the UBC Sauder School of Business in 2009 with a Master of Management degree. She is currently a Professional Engineer registered with the Association of Professional Engineers and Geoscientists of British Columbia as well as a Project Management Professional. She served as an engineer and project manager at Vancouver International Airport prior to the 2017 election.

Prior to becoming involved in provincial politics, Ma led grassroots efforts against Bill C-51 after publicly challenging Justin Trudeau on his support for the bill during a public Q&A event at the University of British Columbia.

Ma was the fourth female president of the UBC Engineers and led the reform of the organization. Created in 2008, the Engineering Undergraduate Society of the University of British Columbia awards the "Bowinn Ma Award" annually "in recognition of exceptional dedication, service, and self-sacrifice by an individual in completing their duties, both within and beyond the purview of their position".

Provincial politics

Upon being elected as MLA for North Vancouver-Lonsdale, Ma created the Bowinn Ma MLA Social Justice Scholarship: three $500 community scholarships, awarded to one graduating high school student each from Carson Graham Secondary, Sutherland Secondary and the Squamish Nation.  The scholarship is aimed at graduating high school students enrolled in a post-secondary institution who have demonstrated a commitment to social justice and overcome barriers or disadvantages in their life.

In 2018, Ma made headlines for her #MeToo statement in the BC Legislature voicing support for Christine Blasey Ford's experience during the Brett Kavanaugh hearings and then again in early 2019 when she openly discussed her past experience with an eating disorder for Provincial Eating Disorder Awareness Week.

MLA Ma was first offered a ministerial role as 'Minister of Citizenship Services', in early 2020, still during her first term in office. However, she reluctantly declined the offer to focus on her work as a local MLA.

Ma in the 2020 British Columbia general election won a personal endorsement from the former Green Party of British Columbia leader Andrew Weaver early in the campaign.  In the words of Weaver, “There are few elected officials who work harder for their community and it is evident that she cares deeply about people. Bowinn has been a breath of fresh air in the Legislature and is one of our strongest voices in the fight against climate change. I certainly hope she is re-elected in North Vancouver-Lonsdale.”   Ma did acknowledge her odds of winning on a podcast recorded before the campaign began, “Even before COVID, I was targeted a lot by the BC Liberals and I don’t think that they’re wrong to target this seat. I’m the first BC NDP MLA to win a seat on the North Shore in a very long time, since 1991… So, history says that I will probably lose my seat at the next election, honestly.”   Nevertheless, Ma told the North Shore News, “Our government simply does not have the runway remaining to lead this province all the way out of the pandemic in a manner that the British Columbians deserve.  We would have lost 12 months to partisan bickering and electioneering, which was already happening regardless of an early election call.”   As of early October 25, 2020; Ma has been declared the winner of the 2020 British Columbia general election for North Vancouver-Lonsdale by many British Columbia news outlets and told the North Shore News, “Votes are not owned, they're earned. And I will continue to work hard every single day for as long as I have the honour of serving North Vancouver-Lonsdale to deserve their support.”

Transportation
Since getting elected in 2017, Ma has focused largely on transportation-related issues. Ma had campaigned heavily on the issue of transportation during the 2017 election. Ma hosted and moderated a "Traffic Sucks!" forum in February 2017, during which Ma said housing affordability is a key factor when it comes to traffic congestion. Ma also campaigned on "increased investment in public infrastructure as a means of producing jobs, boosting the economy, and ensuring that the province is able to meet the needs of its businesses and residents long into the future" and expanding BC's rapid transportation network "as a way of providing a long-term solution to traffic congestion in the North Shore and throughout the Lower Mainland and as a key component of a sustainable transportation model for a growing province".

On July 18, 2017 Ma was appointed Parliamentary Secretary for TransLink, working under the Minister of Municipal Affairs and Housing, Selina Robinson. Her main job as Parliamentary Secretary for TransLink is overseeing the transit authority as it goes through a critical phase of expansion. The NDP has already committed to funding 40 per cent of the TransLink Mayors' Council vision, which includes another SeaBus and 10-minute service, a B-line bus from Phibbs Exchange to Dundarave and an increase in regular bus service.

Ma was also selected to serve as the Chair of the Select Standing Committee on Crown Corporations. Ma led the all-party committee consisting of BC Liberal, BC NDP, and BC Green MLAs in the creation of a unanimous report dated February 15, 2018, making 32 recommendations for establishing a provincial regulatory regime to govern transportation network companies providing ride-hailing services. She reconvened the all-party committee again in 2019 in the creation of a second consensus report dated March 12, 2019, making 11 recommendations on four specific areas of regulation of the Transportation Network Services industry: Boundaries, Supply, Fares, and Driver's Licenses.

Although outside of the official purview of her role as Parliamentary Secretary for TransLink, Ma also worked with in her first term with Minister of Transportation and Infrastructure, Claire Trevena to increase BC Transit bus service. Ma initiated the Integrated North Shore Transportation Planning Project in 2018 and served as its Chair until the release of its final report in September 2018, which now serves as the North Shore's action plan and guiding document for improving transportation.

As of November 26, 2020, Minister of State for Infrastructure Ma has a mandate letter to, "Support our economic recovery from the COVID-19 pandemic by working with the Minister of Transportation and Infrastructure to advance critical pieces of transportation infrastructure that will benefit communities across B.C."  Projects according to the letter will include, "Work to extend the Millennium Line to Arbutus, with an eventual terminus at UBC, and ensure prompt design and construction of the Surrey-Langley Skytrain."  Also a widening of Highway 1, replacing the Massey Crossing, completing the Pattullo Bridge replacement, and finally supporting, "The planning and development of key transit projects, like high-speed transit links for the North Shore and the expansion of rail up the Fraser Valley, which will bring cleaner transit, support economic growth and deliver more construction jobs for B.C. workers."

Integrated North Shore Transportation Planning Project (INSTPP)
Ma initiated the Integrated North Shore Transportation Planning Project in 2018 and served as its Chair. The Integrated North Shore Transportation Planning Project "is a cross-jurisdictional and collaborative forum initiated to provide an integrated transportation approach that is environmentally progressive, values safety, improves the movement of people and goods, and respects First Nation's interests." Major partners in the project include the City of North Vancouver, District of North Vancouver, District of West Vancouver, TransLink, Government of Canada, Government of BC Ministry of Transportation and Infrastructure, Tsleil-Waututh Nation and Squamish Nation. It released its report publicly on September 13, 2018.

According to the Letter from the Chair, "the work was conducted with a level of inter-agency collaboration that is unprecedented" and "represents the first time that key public transportation agencies on the North Shore, including seven governments, have been able to collectively establish a comprehensive understanding of the transportation challenges that North Shore communities face, and produce a unified and actionable approach for moving forward as a region."

North Shore Rapid Transit 

Ma is vocal in her support for rapid bus lines as precursors for rapid transit, including a controversial rapid bus line running through the North Vancouver (district municipality), North Vancouver (city), and West Vancouver. In response to opposition from businesses and residents of West Vancouver, Ma created a West Vancouver B-Line themed parody of 'Hey Jude' by The Beatles. Ma is credited with the genesis of the first-ever study into the feasibility of a rapid transit line connecting the North Shore and downtown Vancouver, which was launched by the provincial government in May 2019.

However, Ma and TransLink did succeed after much consultation in getting a RapidBus (TransLink) line from Park Royal Exchange eastward as R2 Marine Dr to Phibbs Exchange.  The express bus service with bus rapid transit elements was launched on April 6, 2020 quietly due to the COVID-19 pandemic in British Columbia for as Ma herself told the North Shore News that, “The Marine-Main R2 RapiBus is, arguably, the most exciting public transit service improvement to the North Shore since the SeaBus.  I didn't get on to it because I did not have any essential travel to justify getting onto a bus.”   Some of her fans on social media call this the "#BowinnLine" as a tribute to her courageous leadership.

As the new Minister of State for Infrastructure, one of Minister Ma's projects is, "Work with cabinet colleagues, communities and regions to support the planning and development of key transit projects, like high-speed transit links for the North Shore ... which will bring cleaner transit, support economic growth and deliver more construction jobs for B.C. workers."

Housing 
Ma is a vocal advocate for action on Metro Vancouver's housing crisis. Her support for housing demand management measures like the BC NDP Government increases to the foreign buyers tax, new speculation tax, and increased school tax rate on homes over $3M has drawn criticism from prominent Realtors and anti-tax advocates in wealthy constituencies nearby.

In 2018, Ma raised funds for the North Vancouver homeless shelter by spending the night in her car with the North Vancouver St. John's Anglican Church group and helped the North Vancouver youth safe house receive operational funding from the provincial government for the first time since it opened in 2008. Ma joined high school students from Carson Graham Secondary in sleeping outside overnight to raise funds for Covenant House, an agency for homeless youth who have fled abuse or been forced from their homes. She is also known for her work supporting vulnerable renters.

Electoral record

References

External links

1985 births
Living people
British Columbia New Democratic Party MLAs
Canadian engineers
Canadian people of Taiwanese descent
Canadian women engineers
Women MLAs in British Columbia
University of British Columbia Faculty of Applied Science alumni
UBC Sauder School of Business alumni
21st-century Canadian politicians
21st-century Canadian women politicians
21st-century Canadian engineers
21st-century women engineers